Northern Syria or North Syria may refer to:

Upper Mesopotamia, which partly overlaps with northeastern Syria
Northern governorates - of the Syrian Arab Republic
Autonomous Administration of North and East Syria - self-declared autonomous region in Syria
Turkish occupation of North Syria - joint Turkish-Syrian opposition held buffer zone